In fluid dynamics Jeffery–Hamel flow is a flow created by a converging or diverging channel with a source or sink of fluid volume at the point of intersection of the two plane walls. It is named after George Barker Jeffery(1915) and Georg Hamel(1917), but it has subsequently been studied by many major scientists such as von Kármán and Levi-Civita, Walter Tollmien, F. Noether, W.R. Dean, Rosenhead, Landau, G.K. Batchelor etc. A complete set of solutions was described by Edward Fraenkel in 1962.

Flow description 

Consider two stationary plane walls with a constant volume flow rate  is injected/sucked at the point of intersection of plane walls and let the angle subtended by two walls be . The resulting flow is two-dimensional if the plates are infinitely long in the axial  direction, or the plates are longer but finite, if one were neglect edge effects and for the same reason the flow can be assumed to be entirely radial i.e., .

Then the continuity equation and the incompressible Navier–Stokes equations reduce to

 

The boundary conditions are no-slip condition at both walls and the third condition is derived from the fact that the volume flux injected/sucked at the point of intersection is constant across a surface at any radius.

Formulation 

Different authors defines the function differently, for example, Landau defines the function with a factor . But following Whitham, Rosenhead the  momentum equation becomes

Now letting

and substituting this into the previous equation(to eliminate pressure) results in

where  are constants to be determined from the boundary conditions.

The boundary conditions reduce to

where  is the corresponding Reynolds number. The solution can be expressed  in terms of elliptic functions.

Dynamical interpretation 

where  in motion.

 Second case  , all constants are real.
The rich structure of this dynamical interpretation can be found in Rosenhead(1940).

Pure outflow 

and the boundary conditions becomes

The equations can be simplified by standard transformations given for example in Jeffreys.

 First case   are complex conjugates and  leads to

 
 

where  are Jacobi elliptic functions.

 Second case   leads to

Limiting form 

The limiting condition is obtained by noting that pure outflow is impossible when , which implies  from the governing equation. Thus beyond this critical conditions, no solution exists. The critical angle  is given by

 

where

where  is the complete elliptic integral of the first kind.

The corresponding critical Reynolds number or volume flux is given by

 

where  is the complete elliptic integral of the second kind.

Pure inflow 

For pure inflow, the implicit solution is given by

 

and the boundary conditions becomes

 

Pure inflow is possible only when all constants are real  and the solution is given by

where  is the complete elliptic integral of the first kind.

Limiting form 

As Reynolds number increases ( becomes larger), the flow tends to become uniform(thus approaching potential flow solution), except for boundary layers near the walls.

It is clear that  everywhere except in the boundary layer of thickness . The volume flux is  so that  and the boundary layers have classical thickness .

References 

Fluid dynamics
Flow regimes